Jutta Hoffmann (born 3 March 1941) is a German actress. She has appeared in more than 40 films and television shows since 1961.

Selected filmography
 Her Third (1972)
 Lotte in Weimar (1974)
  (1978)
 The Assault of the Present on the Rest of Time (1985)
 Bandits (1997)
 Angst (2003)
 An die Grenze (2007)
 Die Frau aus dem Meer (2008)

References

External links

1941 births
Living people
German film actresses
People from Halle (Saale)
German television actresses
20th-century German actresses
21st-century German actresses